Paul Vermeulen (born 11 January 1938) is a French racing cyclist. He rode in the 1964 Tour de France.

References

1938 births
Living people
French male cyclists
Place of birth missing (living people)